Delight is the fifth studio album by Japanese singer and songwriter Rina Aiuchi. It was released on May 31, 2006, through Giza Studio. The album consists of four previous released singles: "Akaku Atsui Kodou (赤く熱い鼓動)", "Orange★Night", "Glorious/Mind Place" and "Miracle". The "Orange★Night" single version is not included in this album, instead it has received new mix under title "La La La Lovin' you Mix". The album charted at #4 on the Oricon charts in its first week. It charted for seven weeks.

Track listing

In media
Orange Night – ending theme for Anime television series Fighting Beauty Wulong
Akaku Atsui Kodou – ending theme for Tokyo Broadcasting System Television program Ultraman Nexus
Miracle – ending theme for Anime television series MÄR
Glorious – opening theme for PlayStation 2 game Another Century's Episode 2
Precious Place – ending theme for PlayStation 2 game Another Century's Episode 2

References

2006 albums
Being Inc. albums
Japanese-language albums
Giza Studio albums
Albums produced by Daiko Nagato